"Down All the Days (Till 1992)" is a song and single by the British rock group, The Kinks. It was released as the eighth track on the band's unsuccessful LP, UK Jive. The song was written by the band's main songwriter, Ray Davies.

Release and Reception

"Down All the Days (Till 1992)" was first released as a single in Britain (but not America) on 25 September 1989. Backed with a live version of the band's 1964 smash hit "You Really Got Me", the single, like "The Road" before it, was unsuccessful, not charting in any locations. In October of that same year, the song was released on the album UK Jive, where it was the eighth track. In 1990, "Down All the Days (Till 1992)" was used as the B-side of its follow-up, "How Do I Get Close", in Britain. The song later appeared on the compilation album, Picture Book.

"Down All the Days (Till 1992)" was called a "ham-fisted anthem" by Stephen Thomas Erlewine of AllMusic.

References

The Kinks songs
1989 singles
Songs written by Ray Davies
Song recordings produced by Ray Davies
1989 songs
MCA Records singles